Eli S. Strand, Jr. (February 11, 1943 – January 2, 2008), also known as Eli from Westchester, was an American professional football player who played offensive lineman for the Pittsburgh Steelers and New Orleans Saints. He was a taxi squad member of the 1965 NFL Champion Green Bay Packers in the year immediately preceding Super Bowl I.
 
In his later years, he was a frequent caller to sports radio station WFAN (AM) in New York City as "Eli from Westchester." He was known for invoking race into virtually every single phone call, infuriating the hosts, which often resulted in the hosts banning him from calling into the station. By his own admission, his penchant in looking for racism contributed to his early exit from the NFL. While with the Saints, he tried to organize several black players to take action against team management for better working conditions. He had limited clout as a marginal player on an expansion football team and found himself out of the league by the end of the year.

Strand died on January 2, 2008, at Lawrence Hospital in Bronxville, New York, following a brief illness.

References

 https://www.nytimes.com/1994/12/26/sports/sports-of-the-times-a-celebrity-caller-is-king-for-a-day-or-longer.html

1943 births
2008 deaths
American football offensive linemen
Pittsburgh Steelers players
New Orleans Saints players
Iowa State Cyclones football players
People from Bronxville, New York